Muhammad Abdul Latip is an Indian politician and former two-time member of the Manipur Legislative Assembly.

Career
He participated in the 1972 Manipur Legislative Assembly election from Mayang Imphal constituency in Imphal West district. Despite being an independent candidate, he was successful and defeated his rival Khaidem Gulamjat Singh of the MRP. During the 1974 Manipur Legislative Assembly election, he ran as a Manipur Peoples Party politician and was successful once again, defeating his rival Khaidem Mangol of the Communist Party. In 1980, he contested as a Janata Party candidate but lost.

References

Living people
Manipur politicians
Manipur MLAs 1972–1974
Manipur MLAs 1974–1979
20th-century Muslims
Indian Sunni Muslims
Year of birth missing (living people)